Josh Kulick is an American heavy metal drummer who was the drummer of Through the Eyes of the Dead and Given With Honor. Kulick is from Topeka, Kansas.

References

Living people
Musicians from Topeka, Kansas
American heavy metal drummers
Year of birth missing (living people)
American male drummers